The alveolar gas equation is the method for calculating partial pressure of alveolar oxygen (PAO2). The equation is used in assessing if the lungs are properly transferring oxygen into the blood.  The alveolar air equation is not widely used in clinical medicine, probably because of the complicated appearance of its classic forms.
The partial pressure of oxygen (pO2) in the pulmonary alveoli is required to calculate both the alveolar-arterial gradient of oxygen and the amount of right-to-left cardiac shunt, which are both clinically useful quantities. However, it is not practical to take a sample of gas from the alveoli in order to directly measure the partial pressure of oxygen. The alveolar gas equation allows the calculation of the alveolar partial pressure of oxygen from data that is practically measurable. It was first characterized in 1946.

Assumptions
The equation relies on the following assumptions:
 Inspired gas contains no carbon dioxide (CO2) 
 Nitrogen (and any other gases except oxygen) in the inspired gas are in equilibrium with their dissolved states in the blood
 Inspired and alveolar gases obey the ideal gas law
 Carbon dioxide (CO2) in the alveolar gas is in equilibrium with the arterial blood i.e. that the alveolar and arterial partial pressures are equal
 The alveolar gas is saturated with water

Equation

If  is small, or more specifically if  then the equation can be simplified to:

where:

Sample Values given for air at sea level at 37 °C.

Doubling  will double .

Other possible equations exist to calculate the alveolar air.

Abbreviated alveolar air equation 

PAO2, PEO2, and PiO2 are the partial pressures of oxygen in alveolar, expired, and inspired gas, respectively, and VD/VT is the ratio of physiologic dead space over tidal volume.

Respiratory quotient (R)

Physiologic dead space over tidal volume (VD/VT)

See also
 Pulmonary gas pressures

References

External links
 Free interactive model of the simplified and complete versions of the alveolar gas equation (AGE)
 Formula at ucsf.edu
 S. Cruickshank, N. Hirschauer: The alveolar gas equation in Continuing Education in Anaesthesia, Critical Care & Pain, Volume 4 Number 1 2004
Online Alveolar Gas Equation and iPhone application by Medfixation.
 A computationally functional Alveolar Gas Equation by vCalc.

Respiratory physiology